The Kippax was one of the best known and vocally active terraced stands at Manchester City's Maine Road ground. Originally named the "Popular Side" when the stadium opened in 1923, its name was changed in 1956 when the club gained planning permission to build a roof to shield fans from the rain. It was named after Kippax Street which ran along this side of the ground. The Kippax was unique in being a terrace which ran the length of one side of the pitch rather than being located behind one of the two goals, as was more common at the time.

In the summer of 1994, due to the Taylor Report which was released in the wake of the Hillsborough disaster, the Kippax was demolished and a new all seater stand was built in its place. This new stand was completed in stages over the course of eighteen months and was finally opened by City legend Bert Trautmann in October 1995. It housed 10,178 seated fans, had three tiers and was at the time the highest stand in the country.

The club left Maine Road in May 2003 and relocated to the City of Manchester Stadium. The old stadium was demolished in early 2004. Unofficially, the East Stand at the new stadium is also called The Kippax.

References

External links
Maine Road

Kippax
Sports venues demolished in 1994
Demolished sports venues in the United Kingdom